Sancti Spíritus is one of the provinces of Cuba. Its capital is the identically named Sancti Spíritus. Another major city is Trinidad.

Geography
The southern coast of the province is flat, but the western portion of Sancti Spíritus province is mountainous. The southeast has numerous mangroves and swamps. The northern coast contains significant wetlands and protected areas such as the Bay of Buena Vista and the Caguanes National Park.

The largest man made reservoir in Cuba, the Embalse Zaza, is in Sancti Spíritus province.

History
During the 17th century, both Dutch and British pirates attempted to take control of what is today Sancti Spíritus province, but with little success, as the Spanish garrison held them off. From 1660 to 1680, Trinidad was plagued by pirates from Jamaica and Tortuga, and on two occasions, pirates razed the city.

The provinces of Cienfuegos, Sancti Spíritus, and Villa Clara were once all part of the now defunct province of Las Villas.

Economy

Tourism is a big earner for the province, with most of the tourism centered on the old city of Trinidad, a World Heritage-listed city which has dozens of colonial buildings (and almost no 20th-century architecture), dating back to the Spanish conquest in the 16th century.

Francisco Iznaga, a Basque landowner in the western portion of Cuba during the first thirty years of the colonization of Cuba, was elected Mayor of Bayamo in 1540. Iznaga was the originator of a powerful lineage which finally settled in Sancti Spíritus and Trinidad, the location of the Torre Iznaga. His descendants fought for the independence of Cuba and for annexation to the U.S., from 1820 to 1900.

In the area, as with most of Cuba, sugar cane and cattle are important commodities. Large surfaces are irrigated in the farmland between Zaza Reservoir, Zaza River, and Jatibonico River in La Sierpe region. Some tobacco and rice are also grown.

Municipalities 

Source: Population from 2004 Census. Area from 1976 municipal re-distribution.

Demographics
In 2004, the province of Sancti Spiritus had a population of 463,009.

References

External links

Magon.cu: Sancti Spíritus Province portal— 

 
Provinces of Cuba
 States and territories established in 1976